The Urban Administrative and Law Enforcement Bureau, commonly shortened to Chengguan, is a local government agency that has been established in every city in Mainland China.

The agency is usually part of a city or municipality's Urban Management Bureau. The agency is in charge with enforcement of urban management of the city. This includes local bylaws, city appearance bylaws, environment, sanitation, work safety, pollution control, health, and can involve enforcement in planning, greening, industry and commerce, environment protection, municipal affairs and water in large cities.

The agents of the bureau are civil servants that do not have the power of the police.

The bureau is sometimes translated in English as Urban Administrative Enforcement Bureau or Urban Management Enforcement Bureau.

History 
The Urban Administrative and Law Enforcement Bureau was established in 2001/2002 for all major cities in mainland China to improve municipal governance as cities become more crowded and urban issues became more complex.

The bureaus' officials are responsible for cracking down on unlicensed street vendors.  According to the BBC, "Ever since the agency came into existence 10 years ago, there have been repeated criticism of them using excessive force. This para-police force, equipped with steel helmets and stab-proof vests, is often used by local officials as trouble shooters".

In general the Chengguan serve as an official agency employed by cities across China "to tackle low-level crime." However, the agency is widely disliked by the Chinese due to their abuses of power.

Criticism 

Chengguan have been involved in several high-profile cases that highlighted public discontent towards a perceived abuse of power by Chengguan.  One high-profile case involved Cui Yingjie, who killed a Chengguan in 2006 after a confrontation in Beijing.  Public support for Cui Yingjie before and during the trial may have affected the leniency shown to Cui, who received a commuted death sentence.

Following an incident in Tianmen City, Hubei province in January 2008 in which the manager of a construction company, Wei Wenhua, was beaten to death for filming the actions of the Chengguan in a local dispute over rubbish dumping, nationwide calls were made to abolish the unit. Thousands of messages were posted over the Internet and protests took place in Hubei province. According to sources,  some Chengguan officials have connections to organized crime.

A 2012 report by Human Rights Watch documents Chengguan abuses, "including assaults on suspected administrative law violators, some of which lead to serious injury or death, illegal detention, and unlawful forceful confiscation of property."

There were multiple cases in 2011 and 2012 throughout China where police officers were attacked by groups of chengguan agents when responding to incidents of chengguan's use of violence and abuse.

In 2012, the Chengguan agency in Wuhan announced formation of an internal 'militia' or paramilitary-type division.

In 2013, a watermelon seller, Deng Zhengjia, was reported to have been beaten to death with his own scales by Chengguan. His body was protected by people on the street to prevent authorities from seizing it and to "preserve evidence." Violence ensued. Prominent microbloggers have called for the end to what has been termed a "thuggish" organization.

In 2014, a man filming the Chengguan abusing a female street vendor was brutally beaten with a hammer until he was vomiting blood. He was pronounced dead on the way to the hospital. The five Chengguan officers were severely beaten, and four confirmed dead later, with pictures posted on Sina Weibo.

In popular culture 
As a result of its notorious reputation, the Chengguan has become a popular target of jokes and internet memes by the Chinese public.

Time magazine reports that beatings by Chengguan officers have become such commonplace news that, "The word 'Chengguan' has even taken on an alternate meaning in Chinese. "Don't be too Chengguan" is an appeal not to bully or terrorize. In other words, "Chengguan" has literally become synonymous with "violence"."The Chengguan is coming!", a phrase often shouted out by illegal street vendors to warn others to run away in case of a Chengguan inspection, has become a famous Chinese Internet punch line.

There are also satirical jokes of the Chengguan actually being China's secret strategic reserves, the "fifth branch of the PLA", because of their capability to cause "mass destruction". Punch lines such as "Give me 300 Chengguan, I will conquer..." and "China has pledged not to be the first to use Chengguan at any time or under any circumstances in order to keep world peace and stability" have gone viral among Chinese netizens in recent years.

Administrative structure 
The bureau is usually structured along two offices and six departments.
 Administrative Office
 Comprehensive Management Department
 City Appearance Management Department
 Enforcement Management Department
 Legal Department
 Information Department
 Outdoor Advertisement Management Department
 Supervision Office

See also 

 Bylaw
 Bylaw enforcement officer
 Ministry of Public Security (China)
 Law enforcement agency
 Law enforcement in China

References

External links 
 Article 16 and Article 17 of the Law of the People’s  Republic of China on Administrative Punishment
 Article 17, paragraph 2 and Article 70 of the Administrative Compulsion Law of the People’s Republic of China
 Regulations of Shanghai Municipality on Administrative Law Enforcement in Urban Management
 Local People's Congress and their Standing Committees, the People's Republic of China
 Article 106 of the Civil Servant Law of the People's Republic of China
 Procedures of the Administration of Shanghai Municipality Administrative Law Enforcement Certificate
 Article 10 and Article 11 of the Regulations of Shanghai Municipality on Sub-district Offices
 English News articles about Chengguan
 Above the Law? China's Bully Law-Enforcement Officers - TIME magazine
 Human Rights Watch report: “Beat Him, Take Everything Away” Abuses by China’s Chengguan Para-Police
 China's 'para-police' brutality under scrutiny - Christian Science Monitor, via YAHOO! News

Government agencies of China
2001 establishments in China
Law enforcement agencies of China
Paramilitary organizations based in China
Political repression in China
Political scandals in China